Pacific Fire is an archival studio album by George Benson released in 1983 by CTI Records.  This album consists of unreleased tracks recorded during the 1975 Good King Bad sessions. It is credited as the final release for CTI before the label temporarily folded until the 1990s. It was given its first ever official CD issue as a Japanese only release in 2017.

Track listing

Side one
"Knock on Wood" (Eddie Floyd, Steve Cropper) – 8:15
"Moody's Mood" (James Moody, Eddie Jefferson) – 6:26
"Bandoleros Caballa" (Ronnie Foster) – 3:42

Side two
"Melodia Español" (Benson, Hubert Laws) – 4:38
"Pacific Fire" (Ronnie Foster) – 6:58
"Let Your Love Come Out" (Ronnie Foster) – 2:31
"Em" (Philip Namanworth) (originally included on Good King Bad) – 5:19

Personnel
 George Benson – lead guitar, arrangements (2, 4)
 Eric Gale – rhythm guitar
 Ronnie Foster – keyboards, acoustic piano solo (2), arrangements (3, 5, 6)
 Don Grolnick – keyboards
 Roland Hanna – keyboards, acoustic piano solo (5)
 Bobby Lyle – keyboards
 Gary King – electric bass, arrangements (7)
 Dennis Davis – drums 
 Steve Gadd – drums
 Andy Newmark – drums
 Sue Evans – percussion
 Michael Brecker – saxophone, flute, woodwinds
 Ronnie Cuber – saxophone, flute, woodwinds
 Joe Farrell – saxophone, flute, woodwinds
 Romeo Penque – saxophone, flute, woodwinds
 David Sanborn – saxophone, flute, woodwinds
 David Tofani – saxophone, flute, woodwinds
 Frank Vicari – saxophone, flute, woodwinds
 Hubert Laws – flute solo (4)
 Fred Wesley – trombone solo (1, 5)
 Randy Brecker – trumpet
 Dave Matthews – arrangements (1)

Production
 Creed Taylor – producer 
 Rudy Van Gelder – engineer
 Chuck Stewart – photography
 Blake Taylor – artwork, design

References

1983 albums
George Benson albums
CTI Records albums
Albums arranged by David Matthews (keyboardist)
Albums produced by Creed Taylor
Albums recorded at Van Gelder Studio